Alpine Meadows is a ski resort in the western United States, located in Alpine Meadows, California.

JMA Ventures, owner of the Homewood Mountain Resort on the west shore of Lake Tahoe, purchased Alpine Meadows from Powdr Corporation in July 2007. In 2011, Alpine Meadows merged with the well-known neighboring ski resort and 1960 Olympic site, Squaw Valley. Ownership transferred largely to the umbrella company Squaw Valley Ski Holdings, LLC. In 2018, this was merged into the Alterra Mountain Company. Today, the two resorts operate as one with a single-season pass and a gondola connecting the two base areas, though each retains its distinct identity.

History

Alpine Meadows opened  in 1961. John Reily developed it initially as the Ward Peak Ski Resort, and had a vision to develop the terrain into a ski resort as an alternative to Squaw Valley. With the help of Peter Klaussen and a number of families who pooled resources to develop the area, Alpine Meadows was founded in 1958 and opened in 1961. The idea for the resort was to focus more on the pleasure of skiing than business profit. It was thought that the idea for the resort came about after the resort’s founders visited Squaw Valley during the 1960 Olympics and noticed the potential of the adjacent terrain. Alpine Meadows opened for the 1961–62 season with three lifts.

The resort made headlines  in 1982 after an early spring avalanche hit its base area in the late afternoon of March 31 and killed seven.  One survivor was buried for five days.

Philanthropy and environmental activities
Alpine Meadows is heavily involved with the North Lake Tahoe/Truckee community. It supports a variety of non-profit organizations with the goal of contributing positively to the local community, particularly through education and environmental protection programs.

The resort partners with the Disabled Sports USA Far West’s Program Center — DSUSA helps make skiing or snowboarding possible for anyone with physical, cognitive, or development disabilities.

Alpine Meadows is an advocate of environmental protection. It engages in projects supporting biodiesel fuel use, has implemented summer native-plant vegetation projects, and has incorporated many recycling programs into its operations. Alpine Meadows, along with Squaw Valley, supports the Truckee River Watershed Council, the Tahoe Fund and Friends of Squaw Creek as part of the company’s community giving through charitable donations or active participation.

Lifts

 Summit Express
 Roundhouse Express
 TreeLine Cirque (formerly Hot Wheels)
 Yellow Chair
 Meadow Chair
 Subway Chair
 Kangaroo Chair
 Alpine Bowl Chair (known as ABC)
 Scott Chair
 Lakeview Chair
 Sherwood Express
 Kids Carpet (surface lift)
 Adult Carpet (surface lift)

Movie location
Alpine Meadows was featured as the location of the fictional "Alpine College" in the movie Wild Wild Winter. Portions of the movie, including all exterior sequences, were filmed at the resort. The 1966 Universal Pictures comedy was directed by Lennie Weinrib and starred Gary Clarke and Chris Noel.

Jamaican ski team
Alpine Meadows is a partnership inspired by Errol Kerr, a resident of Truckee who has U.S. and Jamaican citizenship. Kerr represented Jamaica in the 2010 Winter Olympics.

Squaw Valley merger and gondola controversies

In September 2011, Alpine Meadows and Squaw Valley Ski Resort merged under common management led by Squaw Valley’s parent company, KSL Capital Partners. Alpine Meadows’ parent, JMA Ventures, owns a smaller part. The new umbrella entity over both resorts will be known as Squaw Valley Ski Holdings, LLC. Squaw Valley Ski Holdings seeks to connect the two resorts with a “Base-to-Base” gondola. It has been discussed in the media that the new company will seek to eventually combine the two resorts into one mega-resort through an agreement with a local property owner, Troy Caldwell, who owns the land connecting Alpine Meadows and Squaw Valley - White Wolf Mountain. If connected via White Wolf, the combined ski area would be the second-largest resort in North America, behind Whistler Blackcomb. Alpine Meadows and Squaw Valley offers visitors 6,000 skiable acres, eight peaks, 44 lifts, and over 270 trails. Resort owners need permission from local land managers, including both Placer County and the Tahoe National Forest which are currently studying the proposed project’s environmental impacts. A number of conservation organizations, including Sierra Watch and the Sierra Club, consider the proposed gondola a threat to Granite Chief Wilderness.

References

External links
 

Avalanches in the United States
Alterra Mountain Company
Sports venues in Placer County, California
Ski areas and resorts in California
Tourist attractions in Placer County, California